Fern G. Z. Carr is a contemporary Canadian poet who resides in Kelowna, British Columbia. A full member of the League of Canadian Poets, Fern G. Z. Carr is the author of Shards of Crystal (Silver Bow Publishing, 2018). She is a former lawyer, teacher, and past president of both the Kelowna branch of the BC Society for Prevention of Cruelty to Animals (SPCA) and Project Literacy Central Okanagan Society. Carr composes and translates poetry in six languages, including Mandarin.

Published hundreds of times in poetry anthologies, journals, and magazines in thirty-five countries and online, Fern G. Z. Carr also curates a YouTube Channel of her poetry. Her channel includes illustrated narrated readings, recorded live performances, foreign-language poems with English translations, interviews, highlights, articles, plus poetry lesson plans and guides.

One of Carr's poems is currently orbiting the planet Mars aboard NASA's MAVEN spacecraft.

Personal life and education
Fern G. Z. Carr was born in 1956 in Winnipeg, Manitoba. Carr attended the University of Manitoba where she obtained her Bachelor of Arts degree (BA) and her Bachelor of Laws degree (LLB). She received her Call to the Bar from the Law Society of Manitoba. After briefly practising law, Carr decided to pursue her interest in languages. She enrolled at le Collège Universitaire de Saint-Boniface where she received her Certificat en Éducation and was the recipient of the Manitoba Government Book Prize for highest standing in her program. She subsequently taught French Immersion before moving to Kelowna with her family in 1999. She is married and was the sister-in-law of the late Jim Carr, Member of Parliament for Winnipeg South Centre.

Writing style and influences
Carr's early poetry from the late 1970s to the mid-1990s is more representative of traditional meter and rhyme. She subsequently began to experiment with different forms and styles while continuing to compose traditional poetry in set forms such as pantoum and ghazal. An admirer of Emily Dickinson, Carr liked the use of em dashes and often incorporated them into her poems. In the 2000s, Carr's poetry style became more eclectic as she experimented with design. This was particularly evident in her visual and concrete poetry as well as in her experimental math / science poems such as "The Fickle Nature of the Parabola" and "Holocaust Genealogy". To date, her stylistic focus is free verse.

While Carr's poetry primarily is written in English, she also composes poems in French, Spanish, Italian, Yiddish and the Chinese Mandarin dialect. Even though she occasionally translates the works of other poets, she tends to focus on bilingual and trilingual side-by-side translations of her own poetry.

Many of Carr's poems were influenced by her early years in Winnipeg's West End where she bore witness to poverty and crime. While this darkness is evident in some of her poetry, she also composes poems which evoke a diverse array of human emotions.

Shards of Crystal
Shards of Crystal reflects a dichotomy and as such, is described as a metamorphosis of darkness to light. Dealing with issues such as suicide, trauma, dementia, cruelty to animals, and the death of a child, the book then gradually changes course. It begins its transformative move towards the beauty of life with poems about musicality, spiritual liberation and the philosophy of existence. It culminates in a philosophical examination of mankind's place in the universe with Carr's signature poem, "I Am".

The imagery in Shards of Crystal parallels the darkness-to-light chronology of Carr's poems. This transition is essentially a redemptive move both literally and metaphorically, reconciling the pain of "Shards" at the outset of the book with the beauty and enlightenment of "Crystal" at the conclusion. Beginning with the darkness of night and becoming progressively lighter, her poems ultimately achieve the illumination of the eternal. This is in keeping with the overarching theme of hope as expressed by the Victor Hugo quote at the start of the book: "Even the darkest night will end and the sun will rise."

Publications
Carr has been published extensively worldwide in Australia, Austria, Canada, China, Cyprus, England, Finland, France, Germany, Holland, India, Ireland, Israel, Italy, Malawi, Mauritius, Mayotte Island, Mexico, Morocco, Nepal, New Zealand, Nigeria, Peru, Philippines, Romania, Scotland, Seychelles, Singapore, South Africa, Spain, Sweden, Thailand, United Arab Emirates, USA and Wales.

Books
Shards of Crystal (Silver Bow Publishing, 2018)

Online
Plum Tree Tavern - 2022
League of Canadian Poets Poetry Pause - 2020
The Literary Nest - 2019
Antarctica Journal - 2018
Scarlet Leaf Review - 2016
Ekphrastic - 2015

Selected anthologies
Dribbles, Drabbles, and Postcards - 2022
Shield of Wisdom - 2021
Lost and Found - 2019
Celestial Musings - 2018
Nuclear Impact: Broken Atoms in Our Hands - 2017
Childhood Regained - 2016
Contemporary Poetry - An Anthology of Present Day Best Poems Vol. 2 - 2015
Storm Cycle 2013 - The Best of Kind of a Hurricane Press - 2014
The Body Electric - 2013
Sol: English Writing in Mexico - 2012
Butterfly Away - 2011
Van Gogh's Ear 7 - 2010

Selected journals
The Laurel Review 51.2 - 2018
The London Reader - Autumn, 2017
The Café Review 27 - Winter, 2016
Slant - Summer, 2015
Whole Terrain 21 - 2014
Legal Studies Forum XXXVII, No. 1 - 2013
The Toronto Quarterly 8 - Nov. 2011
White Wall Review 135 - 2011
Prairie Fire 31, No. 3 - Fall 2010
Poetry New Zealand 41 - September 2010

Literary nonfiction
Federation of BC Writers WordWorks Magazine - 2022 & 2020
Part of the Discourse: An Interdisciplinary Humanities Journal - 2019

Selected awards and honours
Haiku included on the Going to Mars Contest DVD aboard NASA's MAVEN spacecraft which is currently orbiting the planet Mars
2013 Pushcart Prize Nominee - The Worcester ReviewA winner of Il Premio Nazionale di Letteratura "Il Meleteo di Guido Gozzano" 4° Edizione (Sezione Autori di Lingua Straniera)
Poem, "I Am", selected by the Parliamentary Poet Laureate of Canada as Poem of the Month for Canada, May 2010
Biographical listing in The World's Lawyer PoetsBiographical listing in ABC Bookworld, a reference site for BC literature and authors
Featured online in The Globe and MailPoetry air-dropped in Cyprus in conjunction with Spring Poetry RainFeatured poet ("Lumière sur") Sipay Revue Littéraire Seychelloise Numéro 12
Former League of Canadian Poets' Poet in Residence mentoring young writers
Invited to do poetry readings in Mandarin for Chinese New Year 2020 and Spring Lantern Festival 2020
Featured solo guest presenter at the Rotary Centre for the Arts Mary Irwin Theatre in conjunction with Culture Days and the Kelowna Arts and Culture Festival 2019 
Volunteer spotlight for her work in the promotion of literacy
A winner of the Great Canadian Haiku Contest with Carr's poems set to music and performed by Juno Award-nominated musician Royal WoodShards of Crystal selected as Poetry Super Highway Bookstore Poets of the Week Featured BookOne of three Canadian adjudicators for the Manitoba Writers' Guild Lansdowne Prize for Poetry / Prix Lansdowne de poésie (formerly Aqua Books Lansdowne Prize for Poetry)
Western Canadian Judge - Ford & Jaguar Automotive Journalist of the Year Awards (for two consecutive years)
Winner of multiple contests and awards

Interviews and articlesWhole Terrain, the environmental literary journal of Antioch University (Keene, NH, USA) featured an author profile with Carr. The poet was questioned as to her reflective environmental practices and how they related to her poetry.

Bill Arnott, the curator of Artist Showcase, conducted a lighthearted interview with Fern G. Z. Carr which was also subsequently featured in The Miramichi Reader.

Goodreads posted an Ask the Author series of questions to Fern G. Z. Carr. Topics included: source of ideas for her book, inspiration, current projects, advice for aspiring writers, the best thing about being a writer and dealing with writer's block.

Thomas Whyte curates a series of interviews with poets entitled poetry mini interviews. Fern G. Z. Carr was chosen to be one of these featured poets. She was the subject of a series of six weekly interviews to discuss her thoughts about poetry and her work.Kelowna Now - In Focus did an extensive feature interview about Carr's life, writing career and achievements.

CBC Radio One (Canadian Broadcasting Corporation) host Sarah Penton invited Carr to do a special guest segment on her Radio West show.

University of Winnipeg - P.I. New Poetry on CKUW 95.9 FM.

Poet, Marissa Bell Toffoli, interviewed Fern G. Z. Carr on Words with Writers W³ Sidecar. She interviewed Carr about her poetry writing and revision practices.

Ryerson University's (Toronto ON, Canada) online newspaper, The Eye Opener, published an article entitled "Beyond the White Wall." It included references to Carr's multiple contributions to their journal, The White Wall Review.Subsequent to Carr having been included in a database project in conjunction with research conducted by West Virginia University law professor, Dr. James R. Elkins, The Globe and Mail'' featured Fern G. Z. Carr in their online arts section.

References

External links
Fern G. Z. Carr Website
Poets & Writers
League of Canadian Poets - Review
YouTube Channel

1956 births
Living people
Canadian women poets
University of Manitoba alumni
Writers from Winnipeg
20th-century Canadian poets
21st-century Canadian poets
20th-century Canadian women writers
21st-century Canadian women writers